The Nevada City Classic (previously: Tour of Nevada City; Father's Day Bicycle Classic), one of the most historic and challenging professional cycling races in the US, is held in Nevada City, California. Established in 1960, the Nevada City Classic commonly occurs on Father's Day and brings in thousands of visitors to Nevada County. While the first race brought out approximately 1,500 spectators, the numbers have swelled to 15,000 spectators in recent years. Sponsored by the Nevada City Chamber of commerce, the schedule includes Women's, Junior's, and Master's races, in addition to the Men’s main event. Past winners include Greg LeMond.

Course
The 90-minute race includes 40 laps on a twisty and hilly  circuit with over 300 feet of climbing. The course, basically unchanged since its advent, is considered by experts to be the toughest one-mile criterium in the United States.

History
Established in 1960, the Nevada City Classic is the largest and oldest bicycle race on the West Coast, as well as the second-oldest bicycle race in the country. It was initiated by Charlie Allert, a native of Dresden, Germany, who had been a bicycle racer and master lithographer before arriving in Nevada City by way of San Francisco. With a course laid out by Allert, the first race was held on Father's Day 1961.

The 1961 and 1962 races were won by Bob Tetzlaff, a Los Gatos school teacher. Starting in 1963 when he was 18 years old, Bob Parsons from Pasadena won the race the next five years. John Howard won in 1970. Greg LeMond was the winner for the three consecutive years of 1979-81 and he was subsequently honored when the Nevada City City Council proclaimed August 11, 1986 as "Greg LeMond Day". Todd Gogulski (1986, 1988), Scott Moninger (1994, 1997, 1999, 2006), Alexi Grewal (1993), and Levi Leipheimer (1998) also took the top spot. Having participated in the race 19 years earlier, Lance Armstrong returned in 2009, and won using illegal drugs and methods, and has been disqualified with the result voided It was hailed at the time as the first victory of his comeback as it preceded his return to the Tour de France. Ian Boswell was the winner in 2010.

In 1997, the race was designated a National Classic Pro Points Race, and thirteen years later, in 2010, its course became the starting point of the Stage 1 of the Tour of California.

References

External links
 Official website

Cycle races in the United States
Cycling in California
Tourist attractions in Nevada County, California
Recurring sporting events established in 1960
1960 establishments in California
Men's road bicycle races
Nevada City, California